David Schartner (born 7 September 1988) is an Austrian footballer who plays for TSV Neumarkt in the Austrian Regional League West.

References

Austrian footballers
Austrian Football Bundesliga players
SV Mattersburg players
1988 births
Living people

Association football goalkeepers